Dominique Steele (born January 25, 1988) is an American professional mixed martial artist currently competing in the Middleweight division. A professional competitor since 2011, he has also competed for the UFC, Strikeforce, Bellator, Fight Nights Global, the Xtreme Fighting Championships, B2 Fighting Series and CES MMA, where he was the Welterweight Champion.

Background
Born in Cincinnati and raised in Norwood, Ohio, Steele attended Norwood High School, graduating in 2006. At Norwood, Steele was a standout in wrestling, and held an impressive overall record of 43-1, winning every tournament the school competed in until injuring his ACL at the district tournament during his senior season (his only loss).

Mixed martial arts career

Early career
Steele began competing in amateur fights in 2009, compiling a record of 8-1 with one No Contest before turning professional in 2011. He competed in several different regional promotions across the Ohio River Valley, including one fight stints in both Strikeforce and Bellator MMA, compiling a record of 13-5.

After his victory over Chuck O'Neil in June 2015, Steele signed with the Ultimate Fighting Championship.

Ultimate Fighting Championship
Steele is expected to make his promotional debut as a short notice replacement against Zak Cummings on July 25, 2015 at UFC on Fox 16, filling in for Antônio Braga Neto who pulled out citing injury. He lost the fight via TKO in the first round.

Steele was expected to face Hyun Gyu Lim on November 28, 2015 at UFC Fight Night 79. However, Lim pulled out of the fight in the week leading up to the event and was replaced by promotional newcomer Dong Hyun Ma. Steele won the fight via KO in the third round.  The win also earned Steele his first Performance of the Night bonus award.

Steele faced Danny Roberts on April 23, 2016 at UFC 197. He lost the back-and-forth fight via unanimous decision. Both participants were awarded a Fight of the Night bonus.

Steele next faced Court McGee on August 6, 2016 at UFC Fight Night 92. He lost the fight via unanimous decision.

Steele was expected to face Kyle Noke on November 27, 2016 at UFC Fight Night 101. However, Steele pulled out of the fight on October 21 and was replaced by Omari Akhmedov.

Steele faced promotional newcomer Luke Jumeau on June 11, 2017 at UFC Fight Night 110. He lost the fight via unanimous decision.

Post-UFC career
On February 1, 2018 it was announced that Steele had signed a multi-fight contract with Fight Nights Global.

Championships and achievements

Mixed martial arts
Ultimate Fighting Championship
Fight of the Night (One time) vs. Danny Roberts
Performance of the Night (One time) vs. Dong Hyun Ma

Mixed martial arts record

|-
|Win
|align=center|20–12
|Peter New
|KO (punches)
|B2 Fighting Series 168
|
|align=center|1
|align=center|2:00
|Louisville, Kentucky, United States
|
|-
|Win
|align=center|19–12
|Kelvin Fitial
|Decision (unanimous)
|B2 Fighting Series 152
|
|align=center|3
|align=center|5:00
|Summersville, West Virginia, United States
| 
|-
|Loss
|align=center|18–12
|Teddy Ash
|TKO (doctor stoppage)
|Unified MMA 36
|
|align=center|4
|align=center|5:00
|Alberta, Canada
| 
|-
|Win
|align=center|18–11
|Teddy Ash
|TKO (punches)
|Unified MMA 35
|
|align=center|1
|align=center|4:51
|Alberta, Canada
| 
|-
|Loss
|align=center|17–11
|Matt Dwyer
|KO (punch)
|XFFC 18: Diablo Fight Series 
|
|align=center|1
|align=center|4:59
|Alberta, Canada
| 
|-
|Win
|align=center|17–10
|Travis Davis
|Decision (unanimous)
|Alliance MMA: Steele vs. Davis 
|
|align=center|3
|align=center|5:00
|Columbus, Ohio, United States
| 
|-
|Loss
|align=center|16–10
|Nikolay Aleksakhin
|TKO (punches)
|Fight Nights Global 83: Alibekov vs. Aliev 
|
|align=center|1
|align=center|2:37
|Moscow, Russia
|
|-
| Win
|align=center|16–9
|Karl Amoussou 
|Decision (unanimous)
|Cage Warriors  89
|
|align=center|3
|align=center|5:00
|Antwerp, Belgium
|
|-
| Win
|align=center|15–9
|Portland Pringle III
|Decision (unanimous)
|Colosseum Combat 41
|
|align=center|3
|align=center|5:00
|Kokomo, Indiana, United States
|
|-
|Loss
|align=center|14–9
|Luke Jumeau
|Decision (unanimous)
|UFC Fight Night: Lewis vs. Hunt
|
|align=center|3
|align=center|5:00
|Auckland, New Zealand
|
|-
|Loss
|align=center|14–8
|Court McGee 
|Decision (unanimous)
|UFC Fight Night: Rodríguez vs. Caceres 
|
|align=center|3
|align=center|5:00
|Salt Lake City, Utah, United States
|
|-
|Loss
|align=center|14–7
|Danny Roberts
|Decision (unanimous)
|UFC 197
|
|align=center|3
|align=center|5:00
|Las Vegas, Nevada, United States
|
|-
| Win
|align=center|14–6
|Dong Hyun Ma
|KO (slam)
|UFC Fight Night: Henderson vs. Masvidal
|
|align=center|3
|align=center| 0:27
|Seoul, South Korea
|
|-
| Loss
|align=center|13–6
|Zak Cummings
| TKO (punches)
|UFC on Fox: Dillashaw vs. Barão 2
|
|align=center|1
|align=center|0:43
| Chicago, Illinois, United States
|
|-
|Win
|align=center|13–5
|Chuck O'Neil
|Decision (unanimous)
|CES MMA 29 
|
|align=center|5
|align=center|5:00
|Lincoln, Rhode Island, United States
|
|-
| Win
|align=center| 12–5
|Nick Duell
|Decision (unanimous)
|NAAFS: Caged Vengeance 16
|
|align=center|3
|align=center|5:00
|Canton, Ohio, United States
|
|-
| Loss
|align=center| 11–5
|Jose Figueroa
| TKO (punches)
|Gladiators of the Cage 7
|
|align=center|1
|align=center|2:56
|Cleveland, Ohio, United States
|
|-
| Win
|align=center| 11–4
|Dan Hornbuckle
| Decision (unanimous) 
|NAAFS: Driven MMA 1
|
|align=center|3
|align=center|5:00
|Canton, Ohio, United States
|
|-
| Win
|align=center| 10–4
|Keith Cunagin
| TKO (submission to punches)
|TWEF 15
|
|align=center|2
|align=center|4:48
|Florence, Kentucky, United States
|
|-
| Win
|align=center| 9–4
|Ryan Thomas
| Decision (unanimous)
|XFC 27
|
|align=center|3
|align=center|5:00
|Muskegon, Michigan, United States
|
|-
| Win
|align=center| 8–4
|Nate Moore
| Decision (unanimous)
|MMA Xtreme: Fists Will Fly
|
|align=center|3
|align=center|5:00
|Evansville, Indiana, United States
|
|-
| Win
|align=center| 7–4
|Joshua Thorpe
| TKO (punches)
|AAMMA 33
|
|align=center|2
|align=center|3:52
|Florence, Kentucky, United States
|
|-
| Loss
|align=center| 6–4
|Travis Clark
| KO (punches)
|NAAFS: Caged Vengeance 13
|
|align=center|1
|align=center|1:10
|Canton, Ohio, United States
|
|-
| Loss
|align=center| 6–3
|Brian Rogers
| Decision (unanimous)
|Bellator 78
|
|align=center|3
|align=center|5:00
|Dayton, Ohio, United States
|
|-
| Loss
|align=center| 6–2
|David Branch
| Decision (unanimous)
|Pure MMA: The Beginning
|
|align=center|3
|align=center|5:00
|Plains, Pennsylvania, United States
|
|-
| Win
|align=center| 6–1
|Donald Crawford Jr.
| Decision (unanimous)
|VFL 34 
|
|align=center|3
|align=center|5:00
|Williamson, West Virginia, United States
|
|-
| Win
|align=center| 5–1
|Joshua Blanchard
| TKO (punches)
|Spartan FC 10 
|
|align=center|1
|align=center|3:27
|Ashland, Kentucky, United States
|
|-
| Win
|align=center| 4–1
|Chris Mierzwiak
| Decision (unanimous)
|Strikeforce: Barnett vs. Kharitonov 
|
|align=center|3
|align=center|5:00
|Cincinnati, Ohio, United States
|
|-
| Win
|align=center| 3–1
|Ricco Ralston
| TKO (submission to punches)
|AP: Crossroads of Redemption
|
|align=center|1
|align=center|3:57
|Lawrenceburg, Indiana, United States
|
|-
| Win
|align=center| 2–1
|Keenan Curry
| TKO (punches)
|ICE 53
|
|align=center|1
|align=center|4:30
|Cincinnati, Ohio, United States
|
|-
| Win
|align=center| 1–1
|George Oiler
| TKO (submission to punches)
|AAMMA 13
|
|align=center|1
|align=center|2:07
|Florence, Kentucky, United States
|
|-
| Loss
|align=center| 0–1
|Jason Butcher
| KO (punch)
|Spartan FC 7 
|
|align=center|1
|align=center|0:45
|Lexington, Kentucky, United States
|
|-

See also
 List of current UFC fighters
 List of male mixed martial artists

References

External links

Living people
1988 births
African-American mixed martial artists
American male mixed martial artists
Mixed martial artists from Ohio
Sportspeople from Cincinnati
Middleweight mixed martial artists
Welterweight mixed martial artists
Mixed martial artists utilizing wrestling
Ultimate Fighting Championship male fighters
American male sport wrestlers
Amateur wrestlers
21st-century African-American sportspeople
20th-century African-American people